Something Like Summer is a 2017 drama musical film based upon the 2011 Young Adult novel Something Like Summer by Jay Bell and the first entry in the Something Like... series.

Characters
 Grant Davis as Benjamin "Ben" Bentley
 Davi Santos as Tim Wyman
 Ben Baur as Jace Holden
 Ajiona Alexus as Allison Cross
 Jana Lee Hamblin as Mrs. Bentley
 Ron Boyd as Mr. Bentley
 Tristan Decker as Bryce Hunter
 Madisyn Lane as Krista Norman
 Chip Sherman	as Ronny Adams

Plot

High schooler Ben Bently spots Tim Wyman, his crush, in a park. He drifts off into his own fantasy, singing a cover of Us. His fantasy is interrupted when Allison leaves with Ronny to go to band practice.

Ben knocks Tim over, causing him to injure his leg. He takes him to the hospital and then takes him home. At Tim's house Ben helps take care of Tim and the two begin to converse about the prospect of being gay in Texas. A couple of days go by and Ben's mother confronts him about sneaking out of the house and him lying about meeting up with his friend, Allison. Ben eventually confesses about the situation with Tim and they go have dinner. During dinner, Ben gets grounded for skipping school, but he sneaks out and goes to Tim's house where he sees him making out with Krista and storms off. While at home, Tim calls him asking him to come over to "finish" where he and Krista stopped. Ben arrives and Tim kisses Ben. Ben is surprised because it was his first kiss. Ben promises not to tell anyone what they did under the condition that Tim calls him later.

Later, Tim brings Ben to his art studio at his father's office and Ben is impressed by all the different works of art that Tim has. The two of them continuously kiss and flirt with one another. Tim gives Ben a key to his house. Ben arrives at the Wyman's residence and gets invited for dinner. During their dinner, Ben tells Tim's parents that he has a boyfriend, which immediately causes Tim's parents to become uncomfortable. Later on, Tim tells Ben that his parents do not want him to hang around Ben anymore. The two argue, but eventually plan to work things out.

While out with his mother and Allison, they see Tim with Krista and another student, Bryce. Mrs. Bently is confused, believing that Tim was with her son. That night, Ben and Tim meet up in the park. Tim tells Ben he broke up with Krista for him. They then smell smoke and realize that a fire had been made. As they split up, Ben runs into Bryce and picks up his lighter and runs away when the police shows up. Ben meets Tim begin to argue about the situation when Bryce arrives. Bryce taunts the two of them and a fight soon ensues, leaving Bryce knocked unconscious and Tim telling Ben to leave, breaking off their relationship.

Two years later, and Ben has moved to Chicago but heads home to attend a funeral for Allison's father. On the way home, he meets Jace, a flirtatious flight attendant. After the funeral, Allison convinces Ben to move back to Texas. Later, Ben spends New Years Eve with Jace.

Nine months later, Ben is upset at Jace for not spending enough time with him when Jace reveals that he is moving to Austin to be closer to Ben, but also surprises him with a vacation to Paris, France. While in Paris, Jace convinces Ben to perform a song on stage. Although initially nervous, Ben gets into the groove, but sees flashes of Tim and Allison and stops singing.

One year later, Ben and Allison are at a restaurant where Tim is sitting nearby and comes over. Ben leaves, but Tim follows him out, giving him his number and his sketchbook. Back at their apartment, Ben and Allison are talking about Tim. Allison tells Ben about rumors of Tim having a sugar daddy. Tim calls Ben later that night and the two eventually talk. Ben tells him that he is in a relationship with Jace, much to Tim's dismay.

Jace and Ben are having dinner and talking about Tim coming back into Ben's life. Tim appears with a pizza and invites himself in to get to know Jace more. As Tim talks about his past with Ben, Jace becomes uncomfortable. Tim becomes upset when Jace bring up the sugar daddy rumors. Explaining the situation to them, Tim admits that he wants to be friends with the both of them because Eric was his best friend. Ben arrives at Jace's apartment to meet a young man who is putting a note on Jace's entrance. Ben argues with Jace about the guy as the note was alluding to Jace cheating on Ben while working in Boston the weekend before. Ben storms off and goes to Tim's place. As they talk and drink, Ben becomes drunk and makes a pass at Tim, but is stopped. The next morning, Ben awakes and goes to the backyard where he see the garage door chained shut. Before he can try to break in, Tim arrives and opens it for him. The garage is shown to be Tim's art studio. The two of them kiss and eventually sleep together.

At dinner with Allison, Ben confesses that he slept with Tim. They argue about who Ben should be with, he storms off. The next day, he is walking at school when he sees Tim talking to a young man. He confronts them recognizing him as the guy who put the note on Jace's door. Ben realizes that Tim had put him up to it. After calling Tim a coward, Ben leaves.

After their graduation, Ben admits to Jace that he slept with Tim and Jace leaves him. Ben and Allison gets plane tickets and ambushes Jace while he is working. After the two sing a duet cover of So Sick, Ben convinces Jace to take him back. The scene cuts to three years later at Ben and Jace's wedding. Time passes and Ben is shown singing in a theater production; Tim watching from the audience.

Jace is complaining about his headaches one morning and eventually collapses in a seizure. Being rushed to the hospital, the doctor tells Ben that Jace had an aneurysm and he was too weak to go into surgery for the others. Ben goes into see him, but before anything can be said, Jace seizes up once again and Ben is rushed out of the room. Ben meets up with his parents and they console him after Jace's death. Five years later, Ben becomes a recluse in the Allison tries to cheer him up. Now pregnant, Allison takes Ben out, telling him that he needed it. They arrive at a gallery and Ben notices that the artist is Tim. Tim gives a speech about the people that helped him become the artist he is now, especially Ben. Before he can rush out of the building, he stops at a painting of a heart and sits. After everyone leaves, Tim comes and sits next to Ben and they hold hands.

Reception
Eye for Film reviewed the movie, writing that "Overall, Something Like Summer is very good at what it does, but what it does never really gets beyond the superficial." Film Inquiry also wrote a review, stating "On balance, there is more to like in Something Like Summer than dislike but it doesn’t make it easy: for the most part it feels sincere, wears its heart on its sleeve and considers some profound thematic material – but its issue with plot developments and characters drag it down considerably."

References

External links
 
 

2017 films
American drama films
2017 LGBT-related films
2010s English-language films
2010s American films